The Cheboygan River is a short but significant river in the Lake Huron drainage basin of the U.S. state of Michigan.

The river forms the boundary between Benton Township and Inverness Township before flowing into the city of Cheboygan. The largest tributary is the Black River. The Cheboygan River is entirely contained within Michigan's Cheboygan County, and the county seat of Cheboygan is located at the river's mouth. The river forms the port of Cheboygan and serves as a dock for the ferry boat to Bois Blanc Island and the Coast Guard cutter Mackinaw.

Cheboygan was founded as a lumbering town to cut timbers harvested from the Cheboygan River's drainage and floated down to mills (now mostly vanished) at the mouth of the river.  Today, one of the biggest industries of the town and river of Cheboygan is pleasure boating up and down the river.  The river is a key artery of the Inland Waterway, a pleasure-boat necklace of waterways in the northern section of Michigan's Lower Peninsula.

The river is the namesake for the city and county. "Cheboygan" is pronounced the same as "Sheboygan" (a city in Wisconsin).

Description
The river and other sections of the Inland Waterway are made accessible by locks maintained by the United States Army Corps of Engineers.

In Cheboygan itself, U.S. Highway 23 is carried across the Cheboygan River by the Cheboygan Bascule Bridge, a Scherzer rolling lift bridge built in 1940 and added to the National Register of Historic Places in December 1999.  In 2009, Cheboygan city authorities built an elevated pedestrian bridge across the Cheboygan near its mouth.

The mouth of the Cheboygan River into Lake Huron is marked by the Cheboygan Crib Light.

See also
 List of bridges on the National Register of Historic Places in Michigan

References

External links

 Map of the Cheboygan River, with marinas and boat ramps marked

Rivers of Michigan
Rivers of Cheboygan County, Michigan
Tributaries of Lake Huron